The 2004–05 Virginia Cavaliers men's basketball team represented the University of Virginia during the 2004–05 NCAA Division I men's basketball season. The team was led by 7th-year head coach Pete Gillen, and played their home games at University Hall in Charlottesville, Virginia as members of the Atlantic Coast Conference. On March 14, three days after the end of the season, Gillen stepped down; he was replaced by DePaul head coach Dave Leitao.

Last season
The Cavaliers had a record of 18–13, with a conference record of 6–10, but the team advanced to the second round of the 2004 National Invitation Tournament, where they lost to Villanova.

Roster

Schedule 

|-
!colspan=9 style="background:#00214e; color:#f56d22;"| Exhibition games

|-
!colspan=9 style="background:#00214e; color:#f56d22;"| Regular season

|-
!colspan=9 style="background:#00214e; color:#f56d22;"| ACC Tournament

References

Virginia
Virginia Cavaliers men's basketball seasons
2004 in sports in Virginia
2005 in sports in Virginia